Eudamidus II was the 24th King of Sparta of the Eurypontid dynasty. He was the son of King Archidamus IV, nephew of Agesistrata and grandson of Eudamidas I and Archidamia. He ruled from 275 BC to 244 BC.

Two of his sons, his successor Agis IV and Archidamus V, went on to become Eurypontid kings of Sparta.

3rd-century BC rulers
3rd-century BC Spartans
Eurypontid kings of Sparta
240s BC deaths
Year of birth unknown